is a subway station in Toshima, Tokyo, Japan, operated by the Tokyo subway operator Tokyo Metro.

Lines
Senkawa Station is served by the following two lines.
Tokyo Metro Yurakucho Line (Y-07)
Tokyo Metro Fukutoshin Line (F-07)

Station layout
The station consists of two island platforms on different levels. The Yurakucho Line platform (tracks 1 and 2) is located on the second basement ("B2F") level, while the Fukutoshin Line platform (tracks 3 and 4) is located on the third basement ("B3F") level.

Platforms

History
Senkawa Station opened on 24 June 1983, serving the Tokyo Metro Yūrakuchō Line. 

The station facilities were inherited by Tokyo Metro after the privatization of the Teito Rapid Transit Authority (TRTA) in 2004.

The Tokyo Metro Fukutoshin Line also started operating through this station on 14 June 2008.

The Yurakucho Line platforms were equipped with platform edge doors in February 2014, the last station on the line to be equipped.

References

External links

 Tokyo Metro station information 

Stations of Tokyo Metro
Tokyo Metro Yurakucho Line
Tokyo Metro Fukutoshin Line
Railway stations in Tokyo
Railway stations in Japan opened in 1983